Mark Scanlon may refer to:

Mark Scanlon (cyclist) (born 1980), Irish cyclist
Mark Scanlon (surfer), Australian surfer